The Lola LC89 is a Formula One car designed by Lola founder Eric Broadley and used in the 1989 Formula One season by the Larrousse team. It was powered by the 3.5-litre Lamborghini 3512 V12 engine designed by former Ferrari designer Mauro Forghieri. Drivers of the car included Philippe Alliot, Éric Bernard, Aguri Suzuki and Michele Alboreto.

The car made its debut in round two of the season, at the 1989 San Marino Grand Prix. While the aerodynamics were good and the chassis was on the pace, the Lamborghini V12 engine proved to be generally unreliable, despite its reported . The car and engine combination would only score one point in its racing life with Alliot finishing in sixth place at the 1989 Spanish Grand Prix. Five time Grand Prix winner Alboreto failed to pre-qualify the car twice (Spain and Australia) and failed to qualify once (Japan), in his eight drives for the team in 1989. Alboreto also suffered a broken rib driving the car when he ran over a high curb during the Hungarian Grand Prix.

It was replaced by the Lola LC90 from the 1990 San Marino Grand Prix.

Complete Formula One results
(key)

* All  points scored using Lola LC90

References

LC89